Darwinia peduncularis is a species of flowering plant in the myrtle family Myrtaceae and is endemic to the Sydney region in New South Wales. It is a shrub with flattened leaves and purplish red flowers usually arranged in pairs.

Description

Taxonomy
Darwinia peduncularis was first formally described in 1962 by Barbara G. Briggs in Contributions from the New South Wales National Herbarium from specimens she collected near Hornsby in 1958.

Distribution and habitat
This darwinia grows on sandstone hillsides and ridges in dry sclerophyll forest between Hornsby, the Hawkesbury River and inland as far as Glen Davis.

Conservation status
Darwinia peduncularis is listed as "vulnerable" under the New South Wales Government Biodiversity Conservation Act 2016.

References

peduncularis
Flora of New South Wales
Myrtales of Australia
Taxa named by Barbara G. Briggs
Plants described in 1962